Leccinum aeneum is a species of bolete fungus in the family Boletaceae. Found in the United States, it was described as new to science in 1977 by mycologist Roy Halling.

References

Fungi described in 1977
Fungi of the United States
aeneum
Fungi without expected TNC conservation status